Pocahontas is an unincorporated community and census-designated place (CDP) in Hardeman and McNairy counties, Tennessee, United States. It is eighty-three miles southeast of Memphis.

Pocahontas is a postal city with ZIP code 38061. Big Hill Pond State Park is nearby.

Demographics

History
The community originated in 1828 as a settlement known as Ray's Bluff, located at the confluence of the Hatchie and Tuscumbia Rivers. After a stagecoach line began service in the region, the settlers moved their village to a site on the stage route, on Matamora Hill. A large hotel and several homes were built in Matamora before 1845.

Pocahontas was the site of the Civil War Battle of Davis Bridge.

Notes

External links
 Pocahontas, Tennessee: The Princess of History and Memories

Unincorporated communities in Hardeman County, Tennessee
Unincorporated communities in Tennessee
Census-designated places in Hardeman County, Tennessee
Census-designated places in Tennessee